Trinity Catholic High School was a private, Catholic high school in St. Louis County, Missouri. It was located in the Archdiocese of Saint Louis. The school closed in 2021.

It was located in Spanish Lake Township.

History
Trinity Catholic was established in 2003 from the merger of St. Thomas Aquinas-Mercy and Rosary high schools to serve the northern portion of St. Louis County.
 Its school building had opened in 1959.

Mercy High School, which began operations in 1948, became St. Thomas Aquinas-Mercy in 1985 due to combining with St. Thomas Aquinas High School, which was in Florissant.

In February 2021 the total number of students was 284, with 12th graders making up 77 of them.

Trinity Catholic High School closed at the conclusion of the 2020–2021 school year. The archdiocese stated that it would be expensive to repair the building, and that area families chose other Catholic schools, which is why the number of students had declined. Had the school remained open, it would have had an expected 9th grade enrollment of 37 the following year. It was the final high school in St. Louis County that the St. Louis Archdiocese had directly administered.

Former students at the school told Alexander Thompson of the National Catholic Reporter that they felt betrayed by the school's closure.

Notes and references

Further reading

External links
 School website
News reports on the closing from official news channel accounts on YouTube:
 
 
 
 

Roman Catholic secondary schools in St. Louis County, Missouri
Educational institutions established in 2003
Roman Catholic Archdiocese of St. Louis
2003 establishments in Missouri